Terry Jackson (born December 9, 1955 in Sherman, Texas) is a former American football cornerback in the National Football League. He was drafted by the New York Giants in the fifth round of the 1978 NFL Draft. He played college football at San Diego State.

Jackson also played for the Seattle Seahawks.

1955 births
Living people
American football cornerbacks
San Diego State Aztecs football players
New York Giants players
Seattle Seahawks players